

R02A Throat preparations

R02AA Antiseptics
R02AA01 Ambazone
R02AA02 Dequalinium
R02AA03 Dichlorobenzyl alcohol
R02AA05 Chlorhexidine
R02AA06 Cetylpyridinium
R02AA09 Benzethonium
R02AA10 Myristyl-benzalkonium
R02AA11 Chlorquinaldol
R02AA12 Hexylresorcinol
R02AA13 Acriflavinium chloride
R02AA14 Oxyquinoline
R02AA15 Povidone-iodine
R02AA16 Benzalkonium
R02AA17 Cetrimonium
R02AA18 Hexamidine
R02AA19 Phenol
R02AA20 Various
R02AA21 Octenidine

R02AB Antibiotics
R02AB01 Neomycin
R02AB02 Tyrothricin
R02AB03 Fusafungine
R02AB04 Bacitracin
R02AB30 Gramicidin

R02AD Anesthetics, local
R02AD01 Benzocaine
R02AD02 Lidocaine
R02AD03 Cocaine
R02AD04 Dyclonine
R02AD05 Ambroxol

R02AX Other throat preparations
R02AX01 Flurbiprofen
R02AX02 Ibuprofen
R02AX03 Benzydamine

References

R02